The name Stomio can refer to:
 Stomio, Larissa, a town in Larissa regional unit, Greece
 Stomio, Lasithi, a village in Lasithi regional unit, Greece